Political fragmentation is the fragmentation of the political landscape into different parties and groups, which makes it difficult to deliver effective governance. Political fragmentation can apply to political parties, political groups or other political organisations.

Measures of political fragmentation 
One aspect of political fragmentation can be measured by effective number of parties.

Effects of political fragmentation 
A higher number of parties allows voters to better represent their political spectrum of political positions. The length of government coalition formation increases with number of parties and decreases with preexisting political groups. The effects of political fragmentation are of different importance, depending if the government or the opposition are fragmented.

Prediction of political fragmentation 
The political fragmentation, represented by effective number of parties, is roughly estimated with the seat product model, and increases with district magnitude and assembly size. The Duverger's law predicts majoritarian elections with district magnitude of one favor a two-party system and proportional representation increases the number of parties. In proportional representation, higher electoral thresholds reduce number of parties represented while increasing unrepresented vote. Fragmentation tends to moves toward an equilibrium, regardless of the type of voting system.

References 

Electoral systems
Political science
Political party systems